Helena Rodrigues (born 2 December 1984) is a Portuguese sprint canoer.

Career
Rodrigues has competed since the late 2000s. She won a bronze medal in the K-4 200 m event at the 2009 ICF Canoe Sprint World Championships in Dartmouth.

Rodrigues also competed in the K-2 500 m at the 2008 Summer Olympics in Beijing, but was eliminated in the semifinals.

References
Canoe09.ca profile 

1984 births
Canoeists at the 2008 Summer Olympics
Canoeists at the 2012 Summer Olympics
Living people
Olympic canoeists of Portugal
Portuguese female canoeists
ICF Canoe Sprint World Championships medalists in kayak
Canoeists at the 2015 European Games
European Games competitors for Portugal